Andrés Iniestra Vázquez Mellado (born 11 March 1996), also known as El Lobo, is a Mexican professional footballer who plays as a defensive midfielder for Liga MX club Atlético San Luis.

Career statistics

Club

References

External links
 
 

1996 births
Living people
Mexican footballers
Association football midfielders
Club Universidad Nacional footballers
Venados F.C. players
FC Juárez footballers
Liga MX players
Ascenso MX players
Liga Premier de México players
Footballers from Guadalajara, Jalisco